Tatabad is a part of Coimbatore city. It's a residential cum commercial area. Its closer to Gandhipuram bus terminal. Coimbatore North Railway Station is located in this area. Adjacent places are Gandhipuram, Sivananda colony, Dr. Rajendra Prasath Road(100 feet road).

Following areas constitute Tatabad:
Tatabad 1st cross road
Tatabad 2nd cross road
Tatabad 3rd cross road
Tatabad 4th cross road
Tatabad 5th cross road
Tatabad 6th cross road
Tatabad 7th cross road
Tatabad 8th cross road
Tatabad 9th cross road
Tatabad 10th cross road
Tatabad 11th cross road
S.N.D Layout(South of Coimbatore North Junction)
Dr.Subbrayan Street(Also known as deaf and Dumb road)
Pykara Office Road(Near Power House)
Hudco Colony cross 1 North
Hudco Colony cross 1 South
Hudco Colony cross 2 North
Hudco Colony cross 2 South(Vinayaka TempleLocate here)
Hudco Colony cross 3 North
Hudco Colony cross 3 South
Hudco Colony cross 4 North
Hudco Colony cross 5 North
Hudco Colony cross 6 North
Hudco Colony cross 7 North
Hudco Colony cross 8 North(Connecting Sampath Street with a major Bridge over Sanganoor Stream)
Dr. Alagappa Chettiar Road(Also known as double side road, Its Pedestrians zone in Morning)
Dr. Radhakrishan Road
Six Corner(Major Junction in Tatabad)
Western Parts of Dr.Rajendra Prasath road (100 feet road)

Land rates are going high in these places. 
Bus stops in the area includes Sivanandha Colony, Dr.RadhaKrishna Road(only no5 and 5C stops), Power House Road and Karpagam Cine Complex.

Neighbourhoods in Coimbatore